Jennifer Klein (born 11 January 1999) is an Austrian footballer who plays as a midfielder for SKN St. Pölten in the ÖFB-Frauenliga.

Career

Club
Klein played from July 2013 until July 2017 at SV Neulengbach. After the UEFA Women's Euro 2017, she signed with SKN St. Pölten.

International
Klein represented Austria at the 2015 UEFA Women's Under-17 Championship qualification. She started all six matches Austria played in the competition and scored three goals. Klein was also part of the squad who represented Austria at the 2016 UEFA Women's Under-17 Championship qualification. Again, she started in all six matches her team played in the competition and scored two goals. Klein also represented Austria at the 2017 UEFA Women's Under-19 Championship qualification. She played three matches and scored one goal. In the 2018 UEFA Women's Under-19 Championship qualification, she also played three matches and scored one goal.

On 1 July 2017, Klein was included by coach Dominik Thalhammer in the 23-women squad who represented Austria at the UEFA Women's Euro 2017. The team reached the semi-finals, but she didn't play any match. On 23 November 2017, Klein made her debut for Austria in a qualification match for the 2019 FIFA Women's World Cup against Israel. She replaced Nadine Prohaska in the game's 64th minute.

International goals
''Scores and results list Austria's goal tally first:

References

External links
 
 
 

1999 births
Living people
Austria women's international footballers
Austrian women's footballers
Women's association football midfielders
People from Tulln District
SV Neulengbach (women) players
FSK St. Pölten-Spratzern players
TSG 1899 Hoffenheim (women) players
Frauen-Bundesliga players
Footballers from Lower Austria
ÖFB-Frauenliga players
UEFA Women's Euro 2017 players